The Apparition is a c. 1875 oil on canvas painting by Gustave Moreau. It is now in the musée Gustave Moreau in Paris.

References

1875 paintings
Paintings by Gustave Moreau
Oil paintings of the Musée Gustave-Moreau
Paintings depicting John the Baptist
Paintings depicting Salome